Sada Eidikytė-Bukšnienė  (born 9 September 1967) is a Lithuanian race walker. In 1989 she set the world record in the 3000 meter track walk along with the European record in 3 km walk and 5 km walk. In 1990 she set the world record in the one mile walk.

She was the fifteen time Lithuanian national champion in racewalking between 1986 and 1993. Eidikytė also won a bronze medal at Soviet Union championships.

Personal bests

See also
List of world records in athletics

References 
Lithuanian Sport Encyclopedia

1967 births
Living people
Lithuanian female racewalkers
World record holders in athletics (track and field)
Place of birth missing (living people)